Didymoplexis, commonly known as crystal orchids or as 双唇兰属 (shuang chun lan shu), is a genus of terrestrial leafless orchids in the family Orchidaceae, about twenty species of which have been described. Orchids in this genus have swollen, fleshy rhizomes and thin, pale, upright fleshy flowering stems with resupinate, bell-shaped white or pale yellowish brown flowers. They are native to Africa, Madagascar, Southeast Asia, Australia and various islands of the Pacific.

Description
Orchids in the genus Didymoplexis are small, leafless, terrestrial, mycotrophic herbs with a swollen, fleshy rhizome. The flowering stem is thin, upright and fleshy with a few scale-like bracts fleshy and one to a few flowers. The flowers are resupinate, white or pale yellowish brown and often last for less than a day. The sepals and petals are joined at the base to form a short, bell-shaped tube with the tips spreading widely. The labellum is relatively broad and has a band of calli along its midline.

Taxonomy and naming
The genus Didymoplexis was first formally described in 1843 by William Griffith and the description was published in the Calcutta Journal of Natural History. The name Didymoplexis is derived from the Ancient Greek didymos meaning "double" or "twin" and plexis meaning "twine", "twist" or "weave"  referring to the interlocking calli on the labellum.

List of species
The following is a list of species of Didymoplexis recognised by the World Checklist of Selected Plant Families as at October 2018:

 Didymoplexis africana Summerh. - Ghana, Ivory Coast, Congo-Brazzaville, Congo-Kinshasa, Tanzania 
 Didymoplexis avaratraensis Summerh.
 Didymoplexis cornuta  P.J.Cribb - Java, Borneo
 Didymoplexis cornuta var. betungkerihunensis Tsukaya & H.Okada
 Didymoplexis cornuta var. cornuta
 ''Didymoplexis cornuta var. maliauensis Tsukaya, Suleiman & H.Okada
 Didymoplexis flexipes J.J.Sm. - Java
 Didymoplexis himalaica Schltr. - Assam, Bhutan
 Didymoplexis latilabris Schltr. - Kalimantan
 Didymoplexis micradenia (Rchb.f.) Hemsl. - Taiwan, Vietnam, Java, Maluku, New Guinea, Solomons, Fiji, Niue, New Caledonia, Samoa, Tonga, Samoa, Wallis & Futuna, Micronesia 
 Didymoplexis minor J.J.Sm. - Java
 Didymoplexis obreniformis J.J.Sm. - Java
 Didymoplexis obreniformis var. maliauensis Suetsugu, Suleiman & Tsukaya
 Didymoplexis obreniformis var. obreniformis
 Didymoplexis pachystomoides (F.Muell.) Garay & W.Kittr. - Queensland
 Didymoplexis pallens Griff. - Asia, Southeast Asia, Australia and some Pacific and Indian Ocean islands 
 Didymoplexis philippinensis Ames - Philippines
 Didymoplexis recurvata P.J.Cribb - Philippines
 Didymoplexis seidenfadenii C.S.Kumar & Ormerod - Kerala
 Didymoplexis sirichaii Suddee
 Didymoplexis striata J.J.Sm. - Java, Borneo
 Didymoplexis torricellensis Schltr. - New Guinea
 Didymoplexis trukensis Tuyama - Micronesia
 Didymoplexis verrucosa J.Stewart & Hennessy - KwaZulu-Natal, Madagascar
 Didymoplexis vietnamica Ormerod - Guangxi, Vietnam

Distribution and habitat
Crystal orchids grow in grassy forest, bamboo thickets and rainforest in India, southern China and Indochina to southern Japan and the Philippines, throughout the Malay Archipelago to New Guinea, Christmas Island, tropical Australia, and the southwest Pacific islands. Some also occur in South West Africa and Madagascar.

References

External links
IOSPE orchid photos, Didymoplexis pallens
Flowers of India, crystal bells, Didymoplexis pallens 
Picsearch, Didymoplexis pictures
Swiss Orchid Foundation at the Herbarium Jany Renz, Didymoplexis pallens Griff.
Photo of Didymoplexis verrucosa in South Africa

Gastrodieae genera
Gastrodieae
Myco-heterotrophic orchids